Allan Cameron may refer to:
Allan Cameron, 16th century head of Clan Cameron
Allan Cameron (author) (born 1952), Scottish author and translator
Allan Cameron (British Army officer) (1917–2011), Scottish soldier and creator of the International Curling Federation
Allan Cameron (founder), co-founder of, Kincardine, Ontario
Allan Cameron (politician) (1868–1923), Australian politician
Allan Cameron (rugby union) (1924–2009), Scotland rugby union player

See also
Alan Cameron (disambiguation)